E. E. Hutton House, also known as The Place Called Hutton, is a historic home located at Huttonsville, Randolph County, in the U.S. state of West Virginia.  It was built in 1898, and is a 2½-story, cross-shaped residence in the Queen Anne style.  It has a hipped and gable roof broken by dormers and a three-story octagonal tower.  It features a deep, one-story wraparound porch.  It was built by Eugene Elihu Hutton, Sr., a great-grandson of Jonathan Hutton, namesake of Huttonsville.

It was listed on the National Register of Historic Places in 1975.

References

Houses on the National Register of Historic Places in West Virginia
Queen Anne architecture in West Virginia
Houses completed in 1898
Houses in Randolph County, West Virginia
National Register of Historic Places in Randolph County, West Virginia
U.S. Route 250